Inspired by the terms genome and genomics, other words to describe complete biological datasets, mostly sets of biomolecules originating from one organism, have been coined with the suffix -ome and -omics. Some of these terms are related to each other in a hierarchical fashion. For example, the genome contains the ORFeome, which gives rise to the transcriptome, which is translated to the proteome. Other terms are overlapping and refer to the structure and/or function of a subset of proteins (e.g. glycome, kinome).

An omicist is a scientist who studies omeomics, cataloging all the “omics” subfields.

Omics.org is a Wiki that collects and alphabetically lists all the known "omes" and "omics."

List of topics

Hierarchy of topics
For the sake of clarity, some topics are listed more than once.

Bibliome
Connectome
Cytome
Editome
Embryome
Epigenome
Methylome
Exposome
Envirome
Toxome
Foodome
Microbiome
Sociome
Genome
Variome
Exome
ORFeome
Transcriptome
Proteome
Kinome
Secretome
Chaperome
Allergenome
Pharmacogenome
Regulome
Hologenome
Interactome
Interferome
Ionome
Fluxome
Membranome
Metagenome
Metallome
Microbiome
Moleculome
Glycome
Ionome
Lipidome
Metabolome
Volatilome
Metallome
Proteome
Obesidome
Organome
Phenome
Physiome
Connectome
Synaptome
Dynome
Mechanome
Regulome
Researchsome
Toponome
 Trialome
Antibodyome

References

Systems biology